Michelle Beling-Pretorius, is a South African actress. She is best known for her roles in the popular serials Isidingo, Egoli: Place of Gold.

Personal life
She was born and grew in Eastern Cape, South Africa.

Career
She started acting career at very young age. She first joined South African theater and performed in several stage plays throughout the country. In 1999, she moved to Gauteng to pursue a professional career. During her life in Gauteng, she made her first public performance in Girl Talk 2000. Then she appeared as painful 'Patty' in Grease Stadium Spectacular.

She made television debut with the serial Egoli: Place of Gold in 2009. In the serial, she played the role 'Candice (Candy) Botha Smith' from Seasons 10 to 18. The she made a guest appearance in the serial Generations. She played the supportive role 'Janine Cullanan' in the series  High Rollers and then joined the popular television soap opera Isidingo where she played the role 'Wendy'.

Filmography
 Egoli: Place of Gold as Candice (Candy) Botha Smith
 Generations as Guest Star 
 High Rollers as Janine Cullanan
 Isidingo as Wendy

References

External links
 

Living people
South African television actresses
1988 births
South African film actresses